Anton Valeryevich Spiridonov (born August 5, 1998) is a Russian-American ice dancer. With his current skating partner, Lorraine McNamara, he is the 2023 World University Games silver medalist and 2022 CS U.S. Classic bronze medalist.

Personal life 
Spiridonov was born on August 5, 1998, in Kissimmee, Florida to parents Valery Spiridonov, a former pair skater, and Elena Garanina, a former ice dancer, both for the Soviet Union. His half-brother, Maxim Zavosin, formerly competed in ice dance for the United States and Hungary.

Programs

With McNamara

With Pankova

With Marsh

Competitive highlights 
GP: Grand Prix; CS: Challenger Series; JGP: Junior Grand Prix

With McNamara for the United States

With Pankova for Russia

With Marsh for Great Britain

With Buga for Russia

Notes

References

External links 
 
 

1998 births
Living people
American male ice dancers
Russian male ice dancers
People from Kissimmee, Florida
Competitors at the 2023 Winter World University Games
Medalists at the 2023 Winter World University Games
Universiade medalists in figure skating
Universiade silver medalists for the United States